"What's the Matter with Kansas?" was an 1896 newspaper editorial authored by William Allen White and widely republished across the United States. The editorial criticized presidential candidate William Jennings Bryan, whose populist platform advocated for the free silver standard. The editorial was leveraged by the William McKinley campaign, and has been credited for leading to McKinley's victory in the presidential election. It was also the piece that made White, then 29 years old, internationally famous.

White later stated that he wrote the editorial in haste, referring to it as "pure vitriol" inspired by a confrontation on the street as he was walking to work. He later disavowed the editorial, and advocated for progressive reforms in regular columns in McClure's Magazine.

The editorial and its themes have been invoked numerous times since its initial publication.

See also 
 What's the Matter with Kansas?, 2004 book
 What's the Matter with Kansas?, 2009 film

References

Further reading 

 William Allen White: Maverick on Main Street by John DeWitt McKee (1977)

Opinion journalism
1896 United States presidential election
1896 in the United States
William Jennings Bryan
Politics of Kansas